Jiang Jielian (June 2, 1972 – June 3, 1989) was a second-year student at the High School Affiliated to Renmin University of China. He was killed by People’s Liberation Army (PLA) behind a flower bed in front of Building 29, on the north side of Fuwai Street, Muxidi, Beijing, at the age of 17 when PLA units advanced on Tiananmen Square to crack down on the student-led demonstrations. After the June 4 massacre, Jiang was the first casualty of high school age whose death was acknowledged in internal bulletins by the Chinese Communist Party (CCP) authorities. According to the authorities, Jiang was one of "more than two hundreds" of Beijing citizens who got shot or killed while trying to stop the PLA units from entering Beijing on the night of June 3, 1989. The real figure remained unknown but predicted as at least seven times higher. Jiang's death also triggered the Tiananmen Mothers movement, which was initiated and organized by Jiang's parents, Jiang Peikun and Ding Zilin, both of whom were professors at Renmin University of China. During an interview with a Canadian journalist on June 4, 1993, Ding said, "My government called him a rioter but he was not. He was a student who only had the idea of democracy".

Role during the 1989 protests

After the death of Hu Yaobang on April 15, 1989, Jiang became deeply concerned and enthusiastic about the student movement. After school, he often went to Peking University and Renmin University of China to read the big-character posters, copy down slogans, and listen to speeches. Among those slogans, Jiang copied "Many that live deserve death. And some that die deserve life!" (gai si de mei you si, bu gai si de que si le).
Jiang also participated in several student protests. On April 19, Jiang joined a sit-in in front of Xinhua Gate of Zhongnanhai (entrance to the government leadership compound) requesting that the government re-evaluate Hu Yaobang's achievements, and demanding to be allowed to express their respects to Hu. This protest was eventually broken up by military policemen. On May 13, when the student hunger strike at Tiananmen Square began, Jiang often volunteered as a night guard of student pickets, who were organized to keep order in the Square. On May 17, Jiang and his classmates organized a march in support of university students. Over two thousand students participated in this march, and this was the first time in the movement that high-school students had organized themselves to join a march. A photo recorded a moment of this march: A paper sign held up high by one of Jiang’s fellow marchers, the poster clearly stated their supports of the university students “If you all fall, we will still be here!” (Ni men dao xia, hai you wo men).

Death
On June 3, the situation in Beijing suddenly changed. China Central Television repeatedly broadcast an "Urgent Warning," telling citizens to stay in their homes or they would be responsible for any serious consequences. Jiang became anxious after hearing this news. He worried about the safety of the university students at Tiananmen Square and immediately said he had to join his comrades in Tiananmen Square. Jiang's father, Jiang Peikun, tried to persuade him not to go by saying "Both your brother and sister are married and have left home; if something happens to you, the rest of our life will suffer loneliness." Jiang was not moved by these words, he responded "if all parents act selfish like you two, is there any hope for our state and nation?". In the end, Jiang ran into the bathroom, locked the door from inside and climbed out of the window. (Jiang lived on the ground floor.)
Jiang left home at 10:30 p.m. on June 3. He and his classmate decided to cycle to the Square, but they could go no further when they reached Muxidi. By then the whole area was filled with people confronting PLA soldiers, who were marching toward Tiananmen Square. Following orders, the troops were rushing to get to the Square, and they fired indiscriminately at the crowd. Many people fell and there was blood everywhere. Jiang and his classmate also got shot while they were trying to hide behind the flower bed in front of Building 29. Jiang got hit by a bullet from behind, the bullet running aslant through his heart. His classmate heard him say softly, “I think I’ve been hit.” Then he squatted down and passed out. His pale yellow T-shirt was soaked with red blood. It was around 1:10 a.m. Eyewitnesses claimed Jiang was left to bleed to death, but was eventually taken to Beijing Children's hospital. By the time Jiang was sent to a hospital, his heart had already stopped beating. The death certificate from the hospital stated: “Dead before arrival at the hospital.” Jiang was one of the first victims of the June 4 crackdown in Beijing.

Legacy 
“The important thing is not action, but participation.” These were the last words Jiang left to his mother, Ding Zilin, on the night of June 3, 1989. After Jiang's death, Ding Zilin organized a group named Tiananmen Mothers, which consisted of parents, friends, and relatives of victims of the June 4 military crackdown. Together, these people have transformed themselves from victims to activists, demanding a change in the government's position over the suppression of the Tiananmen Square protests of 1989.

Memorial 
On September 11, 1989, one hundred days after Jiang's death, Ding Zilin and Jiang Peikun took Jielian's ashes home. In front of his ash box, Jiang Peikun carved the following inscription for his son:

Liu Xiaobo, the winner of 2010 Nobel Peace Prize, wrote a bereavement poem to commemorate Jiang while he was visiting Jiang Peikun and Ding Zilin on June 1, 1991, two years after the Tiananmen Massacre.

References

1989 in China
1989 Tiananmen Square protesters
1972 births
1989 deaths
Murdered students
Deaths by firearm in China